Beau Almodobar (born October 25, 1962 in San Francisco, California) played American football in the National Football League. He played college football for the Norwich Cadets. A wide receiver, he played for only one season (1987) with the New York Giants as a replacement player. He wore jersey number 10. Almodobar is currently a physical education teacher at Cyrus Pierce Middle School in Nantucket, MA and coaches the Whalers, Nantucket High School's football team.

He was also a physical education instructor, athletic director and baseball coach at now-closed Thayer High School in Winchester, NH before moving back to Nantucket.

References
Beau Almodobar profile at NFL.com

1962 births
Living people
Players of American football from San Francisco
American football wide receivers
Norwich Cadets football players
New York Giants players